Carabus rothii is a species of ground beetle in the family Carabidae. It is found in Eastern Europe.

Subspecies
These five subspecies belong to the species Carabus rothii:
 Carabus rothii alutensis Savulescu, 1972  (Romania)
 Carabus rothii comptus Dejean, 1831  (Romania)
 Carabus rothii hampei Küster, 1846  (Hungary, Romania, and Ukraine)
 Carabus rothii incompsus Kraatz, 1880  (Romania)
 Carabus rothii rothii Dejean, 1829  (Romania)

References

Carabus
Beetles described in 1829